Grace Kaufman (born April 29, 2002) is an American actress, known for her roles including Kate Burns in the CBS sitcom Man with a Plan (2016–2020), Bronwen in the CBS sitcom Bad Teacher (2014), Ashley Chandler in the TNT action-drama series The Last Ship (2014–2018), and Berry in Disney's Whisker Haven Tales with the Palace Pets (2015–2018).

Kaufman's feature film debut came in Sister  (2014).

Early life
Kaufman was born in Los Angeles, California on April 29, 2002. Her parents are actor David Kaufman and actress Lisa Picotte, and her younger brother Henry is also an actor. Her first acting role was in the 2009 stage production of Meet Me in St. Louis at the Carpenter Performing Arts Center. Her paternal grandfather is Jewish, whereas her paternal grandmother is Catholic.

Recognition
In 2012, Kaufman received the Best Actress award at the HollyShorts Film Festival. In 2014, she won the Discovery Award at the Traverse City Film Festival.

Filmography

References

External links

2002 births
Living people
American child actresses
American television actresses
American film actresses
American voice actresses
21st-century American actresses